Virgil Calotescu (16 January 1928 – 6 May 1991) was a Romanian film director. He directed nearly 50 films between 1952 and 1987. His 1967 film The Subterranean was entered into the 5th Moscow International Film Festival.

Selected filmography
 The Subterranean (1967)

References

External links

1928 births
1991 deaths
Romanian film directors
People from Olt County